Newton Purcell is a village in the civil parish of Newton Purcell with Shelswell in Oxfordshire,  southeast of Brackley in neighbouring Northamptonshire. The 2001 Census recorded a parish population of 103. The parish population from the 2011 Census is not available.

Early history
The course of the Roman road that linked Alchester near Bicester with Lactodurum (now Towcester) runs through the parish just east of the village. The modern road that mostly follows its course is classified as the A4421.

Toponym
The Domesday Book in 1086 does not mention Newton Purcell. The earliest known written record of Newton Purcell is a document from AD 1180 which records the place-name as Neuwenton. An entry in the Book of Fees from 1198 records it as Niweton. A Charter Roll from 1245 records it as Neuton Purcel. "Newton" is one of the commonest place-names in English. It is derived from the Old English nēowa tūn meaning "new homestead" or "new village".

Manor
The manor was created in the 12th century for the Purcel family, mainly with land from two neighbouring manors: Mixbury and Fringford. These manors had different  overlords, and as a result the Purcels had feudal obligations to both. Mixbury was part of the honour of St Valery, which later became part of the Honour of Wallingford.

In 1213 Robert de St Valery gave the mesne lordship of Mixbury to the Augustinian Osney Abbey, and the Purcels and their successors had to pay the abbey rent until the Dissolution of the Monasteries in 1536. In 1475 the manor was still held by a Thomas Purcel, but it had left the family by 1523.

The Purcels had a moated manor house. The house has not survived, but in the 1950s fragments of its moat and a mound where it stood were still visible just east of the village.

Parish church
Architectural evidence suggests that the Church of England parish church of Saint Michael and All Angels was a Norman church built in the middle of the 12th century. The earliest documentary evidence of the church's existence is slightly later, when Ralph Purcel granted the church to the Augustinian Bicester Priory in 1200. Of this original church little survives except a 12th-century Norman doorway and a 13th-century piscina.

In 1813 the church was repaired and most of its original features were destroyed. In 1875 the architect CN Beazley restored the building and added the vestry, bell-gable and south porch. St Michael's rectory was built in 1844. St Michael's parish is now part of the Shelswell benefice.

Economic and social history
The parish was still being farmed under the open field system in 1679. There was no Act of Parliament for the parish's enclosure, so it must have been done by agreement. This may have been before the end of the 17th century.

The village's Church of England school was built in 1872 and enlarged in 1898. It was reorganised as a junior school in 1929 and was still open in 1954.

Buckingham was almost  from the Great Central station, so the name was subsequently shortened to the more appropriate "Finmere". British Railways closed Finmere station in 1963, and closed the section of the Great Central line through the station and parish in 1966.

Newton Purcell was a separate civil parish until 1932, when it was merged with neighbouring Shelswell.

Amenities
Newton Purcell has one pub, the Shelswell Inn. It is on the main road near the site of the former railway station.
Pub closed

References

External links

Bibliography

Villages in Oxfordshire